Resonate is the fourteenth studio album by English hard rock singer Glenn Hughes. The album was released in Japan on 28 October 2016 by Ward Records, and worldwide on 4 November 2016 by Frontiers Records. Hughes has said of the album: "It's possibly the heaviest record I've ever made. I don't want to confuse it with horns-up heavy; it's not metal. But it's definitely f—ing heavy. It's dense. It's dark. There's some aggression on this record. Every bloody track is begging to be played live."

Track listing

Personnel
Glenn Hughes – vocals, bass guitar, acoustic guitar, producer, mixer
Søren Andersen – guitars, producer, mixer, mastering
Pontus Engborg – drums (tracks 2, 3, 4, 5, 6, 7, 8, 9, 10)
Chad Smith – drums (tracks 1, 11)
Lachy Doley – keyboards
Luis Maldonado – acoustic guitar (track 12)
Anna Maldonado – cello (track 12)
Frederik Cupello – assistant engineer
Johan Jørgensen – studio assistant

Charts

References

Glenn Hughes albums
2016 albums
Frontiers Records albums